F.C. Internazionale Milano, colloquially known as Inter Milan in English, is an Italian football club.

Internazionale may also refer to:

Sports
 Inter Milan Youth Sector (F.C. Internazionale Milano Youth Sector), a youth team of Inter Milan

 U.S. Internazionale Napoli, a defunct Italian football club based in Naples
 Internazionale F.C. Torino, a defunct Italian football club based in Turin
 Internazionale Pattaya F.C., a Thai football club based in Pattaya

Other uses
 Internazionale (magazine), an Italian magazine
 Internazionale Holding S.r.l., the former parent company of Inter Milan

See also
 Inter (disambiguation)
 Inter Milan (disambiguation)